Sir Graham Stanley Latimer  (7 February 1926 – 7 June 2016) was a New Zealand Māori leader, chosen in the late 1960s to be a new leader to resolve Māori grievances. He was a member of the New Zealand Māori Council from 1964, and president from 1973. In 1987 he initiated a successful appeal against the State-Owned Enterprises Act leading to actions against the Crown relating to land, forests, fisheries and te reo Māori (mortgaging his farm at Taipuha for the expenses).

Biography
Latimer was born on the Aupouri Peninsula south of Te Kao in Northland, then a depressed area. His mother, Lillian, was Irish-Scottish and his father, Graham, of mixed Anglo-Saxon and Māori ancestry; he was their third son. As well as being a Pākehā–Māori marriage, the bride was Catholic and the groom Anglican, so the couple married in the local police station. The family lived at Pamapuria seven kilometres from Kaitaia. Latimer attended three primary schools, and then went to Kaitaia District High School. He left after two weeks, as he was needed to help hand-milk the small family herd of 14 dairy cows on 48 acres. When the herd was sold because of disputes within his  (extended family), he worked on other farms. He enlisted in the Army in 1943, and went to Japan in 1946–47 in Jayforce as part of the army of occupation.

In 1948, Latimer married Emily Moore; the couple would have five children over their own and were parents to more than 20 other children through whāngai adoption. Latimer worked for the New Zealand Railways until 1961, becoming stationmaster at Kaiwaka in 1952. From 1961 he was a farmer on the Kaipara Harbour; to 1979 at Tinopai and from 1979 to 1995 at Taipuha. In 1995 he returned to Pamapuria.

Latimer was made a spokesman for Ngāti Whātua (though his own hapū is Ngāti Kahu from the Aupouri Peninsula) and a Māori warden in 1956. In 1963 he was elected to the Tai Tokerau District Māori Council in 1963 and one of three members representing te Tai Tokerau on the New Zealand Māori Council 1964. On the New Zealand Māori Council he was vice-president 1969 and president from 1973. In 1977 he was appointed one of the first three members of the Waitangi Tribunal. He was chairman of the Crown Forestry Rental Trust from 1990, and a member of the Treaty of Waitangi Fisheries Commission between 1993 and 1998. He retrieved tūpuna Māori from an English auction house in 1988, and stopped the public sale of human remains.

Latimer was active in other organisations, the Anglican General Synod, on the board of the Museum of New Zealand Te Papa Tongarewa, a member of the Alcoholic Liquor Advisory Council and was a director of several commercial enterprises. He was a member of the National Party, and was Māori vice-president from 1981 to 1992.

He died in 2016 at the age of 90 after suffering from Parkinson's disease.

Honours and awards
In the 1980 Queen's Birthday Honours, Latimer was appointed a Knight Commander of the Order of the British Empire.

References 

1926 births
2016 deaths
New Zealand Army personnel
New Zealand farmers
New Zealand National Party politicians
People from the Northland Region
New Zealand Māori farmers
Ngāti Whātua people
Ngāti Kahu people
New Zealand Knights Commander of the Order of the British Empire
New Zealand Anglicans
Unsuccessful candidates in the 1972 New Zealand general election
Unsuccessful candidates in the 1969 New Zealand general election
New Zealand people of Irish descent
New Zealand people of Scottish descent
New Zealand people of English descent
Members of the Waitangi Tribunal
New Zealand military personnel of World War II